Lennart Ljung may refer to:

Lennart Ljung (engineer) (born 1946),  Swedish engineer and professor
Lennart Ljung (general) (1921–1990),  Swedish Army general